Raghunath may refer to:

Places
Raghunath Temple, one of the largest temple complexes of north India located in Jammu in the Indian state of Jammu and Kashmir
Raghunathganj I, a community development block that forms an administrative division in Jangipur subdivision of Murshidabad district in the Indian state of West Bengal
Raghunathganj II, a community development block that forms an administrative division in Jangipur subdivision of Murshidabad district in the Indian state of West Bengal

People

First name
Raghunath (politician), Indian politician from Madhya Pradesh
Raghunath Choudhary (1879–1967), Indian writer of the Jonaki era of Assamese literature
Raghunath Mahato, Indian freedom fighter
Raghunath Manet, Indian classical musician and dancer
Raghunath Murmu, Creator of Ol Chiki script
Raghunath Pandit, Indian Marathi poet who was active around the year 1800
Raghunath Patnaik, Indian politician, veteran leader of the Indian National Congress
Raghunath Prasanna (c.1920–1999), Indian classical shehnai and flute player
Raghunathrao (1734-1783), Peshwa of the Maratha Empire
Raghunath Seth (1931–2014), Indian musician of Hindustani classical music
Raghunath Singh, Indian Revolutionary
Raghunath Singh, Indian politician and National Congress leader
Raghunath Vaman Dighe (1896-1980), Indian Marathi writer
Raghunath Vinayak Dhulekar (1891-1980), Indian activist, freedom fighter
Raghunath Vithal Khedkar (1873-????), Indian surgeon
Ray Cappo (born 1966), also known as Raghunath, American hardcore punk vocalist

Middle name
Datta Raghunath Kavthekar (1901–1979), Indian Marathi novelist
Narahar Raghunath Phatak (1893–1979), Indian biographer and literary critic
Shripad Raghunath Joshi (1920–2002), Indian Marathi author
Vijay Raghunath Pandharipande (1940-2006), Indian-American physicist

Last name
Aishwarya Vidhya Raghunath, Indian Carnatic music vocalist
K. Raghunath, Indian diplomat who served as the Foreign Secretary of India in the late 1990s
P. M. K. Raghunath (1950–2016), Indian cricketer